Boys was a station on the South Gippsland railway line in Victoria, and opened with the South Gippsland line in 1892. It was one of the first on the line to be closed, which occurred in the early 1960s. The name of station was derived from "Boys Road", which crossed the line at that point.

Disused railway stations in Victoria (Australia)
Transport in Gippsland (region)
Shire of South Gippsland